Zambia was part of the British Empire, when it was known as Northern Rhodesia, until its independence from the United Kingdom in 1964. Both countries are part of the Commonwealth of Nations.

Zambian ambassador Lieutenant General Paul Mihova is based at the High Commission of Zambia, London. Nicholas Woolley was appointed British High Commissioner to Zambia in August 2019.

History
The Zambia Independence Act 1964 was passed, assuring Zambian Independence.

R (Tigere) v Secretary of State for Business, Innovation and Skills was decided by the Supreme Court of the United Kingdom.

References

See also
 Foreign relations of the United Kingdom
 Foreign relations of Zambia

 
Zambia
Bilateral relations of Zambia
Relations of colonizer and former colony